Connacht colleges senior football "A" championship, is the top level Gaelic football competition for secondary schools in Connacht. They compete for the Aonghus Murphy Memorial Cup.

The winners advance to the Hogan Cup, the All-Ireland colleges senior "A" football championship.

St Colman's College, Claremorris beat St Gerald's College, Castlebar 0-15 to 1-11 in an all-Mayo final in McHale Park on 15 March to win the 2019 championship. The teams met in the Connacht "A" League Final earlier in the year when St Gerald's came out the victors.

St Gerald's College, Castlebar beat Summerhill College, Sligo 1-13 to 0-10 in Charlestown GAA Club on 7 March to win the 2020 championship. The teams met in the Connacht "A" League Final earlier in the year when St Gerald's also came out the victors.

St Jarlath's College, Tuam (with 49 wins, the competition's most successful team) beat St Colman's College, Claremorris by a scoreline of 3-06 to 0-09 on 12 February 2022 in a crowded Tuam Stadium in tough conditions to add to their record of 48 titles and make it 49. Man-of-the-match Paddy Egan (from the Corofin club) scored the two crucial goals for St Jarlath's College.

Wins listed by college

Finals listed by year

 Teams in bold went on to win the Hogan Cup in the same year.

See also
 Hogan Cup
 Leinster Championship
 Corn Uí Mhuirí (Munster Championship)
 MacRory Cup (Ulster Championship)

Sources

References

Gaelic football competitions in Connacht